Wasco station is an Amtrak station on the San Joaquin located in Wasco, California, United States. The station has one platform on the west side of a single track.

History

When construction of the San Francisco and San Joaquin Valley Railroad (SF&SJ) had reached the future townsite, a small, open-air, two story station was constructed. It cost $4,500 and followed their standard No. 2 design. There was also a large window, facing the tracks, for the station master to observe activity down the tracks. The town, named Dewey, would develop around the station. It would later be renamed Wasco.

In 1899, the SF&SJ was purchased by the Atchison, Topeka and Santa Fe (part of the Valley Division) which continued to use the station for passenger and freight service. In 1907, the station was extended, to serve a growing demand for freight. In the 1950s, the waiting room was enclosed. The second floor was also reorganized as sleeping quarters.

The station closed in 1971, when Amtrak was formed and none of the routes in the San Joaquin Valley continued to run. In 1974, the San Joaquin route began operating through the valley. Initially, the train did not stop in Wasco. Amtrak added Wasco as a flag stop on October 26, 1975. The train station was demolished in 1978 and replaced with a couple of benches and a parking lot. Part of the train station would be used in the restoration of the Shafter Santa Fe station.

At some point, Wasco became a regular stop for the San Joaquin route, and a shelter was built. In 2006, an entirely new station was constructed. It was designed as an open-air station, built in the Spanish Revival style. It would also house the Wasco Chamber of Commerce.

With the coming of high speed rail project, Wasco city officials have expressed concerns that the Amtrak service might be discontinued. , no decision has been announced.

The station building was demolished in April 2021 to make room for California High-Speed Rail (HSR), though the platform remains in use. A crossing is being built as part of the HSR project's Construction Package 4 to provide pedestrian access from the corner of G & 7th Streets, under the future High-Speed tracks, to the Amtrak platform.

References

External links

Wasco, CA – USA Rail Guide (TrainWeb)

Former Atchison, Topeka and Santa Fe Railway stations in California
Railway stations in the United States opened in 2006
Amtrak stations in Kern County, California